Dashaun Wesley is an American dancer, actor, choreographer, and ballroom performer, MC, and commentator. He is known for hosting the voguing competition series Legendary and for his appearances on the television series America's Best Dance Crew and Pose. He is often called the "King of Vogue".

Early life
Wesley was born in Brooklyn, New York and grew up in its Bedford-Stuyvesant neighborhood. He began dancing at age four. Wesley first encountered voguing at 14 and became involved with the ballroom scene as a teenager.

Career
Wesley has worked as a dance and vogue instructor.

Ballroom
Wesley became involved in ballroom as a teenager in the late 1990s and competed in balls frequently since then, also hosting and commentating at balls. He began emceeing balls in 2003, and first performed voguing "in front of a big crowd" in 2005 or 2006. Wesley has been a member of a number of houses, including the House of Latex, which he joined in 2000; the House of Evisu; and the House of Lanvin, in which he was a father. He is the founder and father of the House of Basquiat, which debuted on the second season of Legendary in 2021.

He is a ballroom legend and received icon status in 2018.

Film and television 
In 2009, Wesley competed on the fourth season of America's Best Dance Crew as a member of the group Vogue Evolution. In 2013, he appeared as a dancer on Hit the Floor. In 2015, Wesley appeared in the film Magic Mike XXL, for which he also instructed Channing Tatum in voguing. Later that year he was an ensemble member in The Wiz Live! Wesley played Shadow Wintour (also known as Shadow Khan) in seasons two and three of Pose. In 2020, he was announced as the host of the HBO Max series Legendary, and has served as host and MC of three seasons. In 2022, he was featured in Billy Porter's performance at the BET Awards.

Music
In 2013, Wesley was featured as a dancer in the music video for Fergie's song "A Little Party Never Killed Nobody (All We Got)". In 2015, he performed as a vogue dancer and commentator for FKA Twigs' show "Congregata". Wesley was a dancer for Rihanna's 2016 Anti world tour and featured in Teyana Taylor's 2018 K.T.S.E. tour. He also appeared in the music video for Taylor's song "Work this Pussy". Wesley is a member of MikeQ's label Qween Beat and was featured on the track "Walk" on its 2016 collection Qweendom.

Personal life
Wesley is gay and lives in Los Angeles.

References

Living people
Year of birth missing (living people)
Dancers from New York (state)
LGBT dancers
People from Brooklyn
Reality dancing competition contestants